= Instituto Jacques Walter =

Instituto Jacques Walter is a Brazil-based institute that aims to preserve and regain Atlantic Forest (Mata Atlântica). It was established in 1999 and is located in the state of Espírito Santo, Brazil. It is a non-profit organization that works with donations and sponsorships for the realization of its work.

== History ==
Over 20 years ago, Michel Frey gradually acquired a 175 hectare piece of land next to his private estate of Capijuma, about 100 km west of Vitoria, the capital of the state Espírito Santo, Brazil. Becoming increasingly concerned with the degradation of the Mata Atlântica, in 1999 he co-founded the Instituto Jacques Walter (after his wife's father) with the aim to preserve and reforest the area. As effective reforestation methods in this area were not yet documented, he experimented with different reforestation methods. Also, with a special love for orchids, Frey committed himself to their preservation, reintroducing many species on the Institute’s land. He also discovered 5 new orchid species (one is also named after him: Pseudolaelia freyi). After the Frey's death in 2006, a new team has continued his work. Under the leadership of his son, Pierre Frey, a team based in The Netherlands and a team in Brazil now coordinate the Instituto. Their aim is to not only carry on Frey's work, but to expand it in several respects to give a meaningful contribution to the reforestation of the Mata Atlântica in Espírito Santo and beyond.

== Objectives ==
- Preservation of original Atlantic Forest
- Reforestation of degraded areas
- Conservation of flora and fauna
- Become an area for scientific research on the Atlantic Forest and its biodiversity (especially orchids)
- Involve other landowners to reforest their land
- Support education by bringing children into contact with the Atlantic Forest and its conservation
